Javier Patricio Ostachuk (born 5 May 2000) is an Argentine professional footballer who plays as a centre-back for Independiente.

Career
Patrick Ostachuk began his youth career as a midfielder in 2004, aged four, with Olimpia de Oberá; who'd later be known as Olimpia / San Antonio after a merger. In 2014, Ostachuk had a number of trials with Newell's Old Boys - who would sign him in 2015. However, Ostachuk remained at Newell's for just one year before departing. 2016 saw Ostachuk, following a trial, join Independiente. He made the breakthrough into first-team football in 2020, having transitioned into a centre-back in the preceding years. Ostachuk made his senior debut on 6 December 2020 during a Copa de la Liga Profesional victory over Defensa y Justicia.

Career statistics
.

Notes

References

External links

2000 births
Living people
People from Oberá
Argentine people of Ukrainian descent
Argentine footballers
Association football defenders
Argentine Primera División players
Club Atlético Independiente footballers
Sportspeople from Misiones Province